The Long River or Longjiang is a river in Fujian Province, China. It starts in Putian's Hanjiang District and crosses into neighboring Fuqing in Fuzhou, where it flows into the Taiwan Strait at Haikou.

The river is dammed upstream of Honglu. The dam forms the Dongzhang Reservoir, on the northern shore of which Dongzhang is located.

The Longjiang Bridge, one in the chain of famous Song bridges on the Fujian coastal road, spans the river near its mouth.

See also

List of rivers in China
Other Longjiangs

References

Rivers of Fujian
Fuzhou